Ballynakill Lough is a lake in Connemara, County Galway, Ireland. The lake is fed by a short stream connected to the nearby Atlantic Ocean. Tooreen Bog is located on the lakes south coast. The village of Cleggan is located to the west.

References 

Lakes of County Galway
Important Bird Areas of the Republic of Ireland